Ip Man (1893–1972) was a Chinese martial artist Wing Chun master.

Ip Man may also refer to:

 Ip Man (film series)
 Ip Man (film), a 2008 Hong Kong film
 Ip Man 2, a 2010 Hong Kong film
 Ip Man 3, a 2015 Hong Kong film
 Master Z: Ip Man Legacy, a 2018 Hong Kong film
 Ip Man 4, a 2019 Hong Kong film
 The Legend Is Born: Ip Man, a 2010 Hong Kong film
 Ip Man: The Final Fight, a 2013 Hong Kong film
 Ip Man (TV series), a 2013 Chinese TV show